Marold may refer to:

Luděk Marold (1865-1898), a Czech painter
, a United States Navy patrol boat in commission from 1917 to 1919